Cosa succederà alla ragazza (What will happen to the girl) is an album by the Italian singer-songwriter Lucio Battisti. It was released in October 1992 by Columbia Records.

The album was Italy's 57th best selling album in 1992.

Track listing 
All lyrics written by Pasquale Panella, all music composed by Lucio Battisti.
 "Cosa succederà alla ragazza" (What Will Happen To The Girl?) – 5:00
 "Tutte le pompe" (All The Pumps) – 4:48
 "Ecco i negozi" (Here Are The Shops) – 5:03
 "La metro eccetera" (The Metro Etcetera) – 4:14
 "I sacchi della posta" (The Mail Bags) – 5:35
 "Però il rinoceronte" (However The Rhino) – 5:51
 "Così gli dei sarebbero" (So Gods Would Be) – 4:53
 "Cosa farà di nuovo" (What Will She Do Again) – 4:56

References

1992 albums
Lucio Battisti albums
Columbia Records albums